Reading Township is one of the fourteen townships of Perry County, Ohio, United States.  The 2000 census found 3,956 people in the township, 2,407 of whom lived in the unincorporated portions of the township.

Geography
Located in the western part of the county, it borders the following townships:
Hopewell Township - north
Madison Township - northeast corner
Clayton Township - east
Pike Township - southeast corner
Jackson Township - south
Rush Creek Township, Fairfield County - southwest
Richland Township, Fairfield County - west
Thorn Township - northwest

The village of Somerset is located in northern Reading Township.

Name and history
Reading Township was established around 1805, and named after Reading, Pennsylvania. It is the only Reading Township statewide.

Government
The township is governed by a three-member board of trustees, who are elected in November of odd-numbered years to a four-year term beginning on the following January 1. Two are elected in the year after the presidential election and one is elected in the year before it. There is also an elected township fiscal officer, who serves a four-year term beginning on April 1 of the year after the election, which is held in November of the year before the presidential election. Vacancies in the fiscal officership or on the board of trustees are filled by the remaining trustees.

References

External links
County website

Townships in Perry County, Ohio
Townships in Ohio
1805 establishments in Ohio